Red Hot Rhythm and Blues is the seventeenth studio album by American R&B singer Diana Ross, released on May 8, 1987 by RCA Records and EMI Records. It was Ross' last of six albums released by the label during the decade. It was produced by veteran  Atlantic Records producer Tom Dowd with one track contributed by Luther Vandross.

Overview
The album made the charts in the UK, Germany, the Netherlands and Austria, as well as reaching the Top 20 in Sweden and Norway. It was Ross's final album for RCA Records, after a six-year stint with the label since Why Do Fools Fall in Love (1981). The album charted inside the top eighty of the Billboard 200 album chart, peaking at No. 73 position.

The album included "Dirty Looks" (US R&B No. 12, UK No. 49), originally recorded by Motown outfit Warp 9, and the retro-flavoured "Shockwaves" which was released as a Shep Pettibone remix in the UK and peaked at No. 76.

A number of major contemporary songwriters contributed new songs to the project including Luther Vandross who also produced "It's Hard for Me to Say" (and later cut the track for his 1996 album Your Secret Love). It also included the first recording of Leonard Cohen's "Summertime" as well as Mick Hucknall's  "Shine" (also released on Simply Red's concurrent album Men and Women).

The album also included cover versions of several R&B classics, including the Bobbettes' "Mr. Lee" (UK No. 58), Jackie Ross' "Selfish One", Etta James' "Tell Mama", and the Drifters' "There Goes My Baby".

The album was promoted with a TV special that aired on ABC on May 20, 1987 titled Diana Ross: Red Hot Rhythm and Blues. The special featured guests such as Etta James, Little Richard, Billy Dee Williams, Leslie Nielsen, LL Cool J, Bernadette Peters and Wolfman Jack.

The tracks "Mr. Lee" and "Tell Mama" were not included on the US version of the album and the mix of "Dirty Looks" on the UK version differs from the mix on the US version.

The cover photography was by Herb Ritts.

Re-release in 2014
The album was remastered and re-released in September 2014 by Funky Town Grooves, as an "Expanded Edition" with bonus material on a second CD. This reissue was licensed from RCA, which owns rights to the album in the U.S. and Canada and is available in these countries (plus, through imports from Solid Records, also in Japan, even when actually Warner Music owns rights here).

Track listing

Personnel 
Credits are adapted from the Red Hot Rhythm & Blues liner notes.

Performers

 Diana Ross – lead vocals
 John Capek – keyboards
 Joseph Joubert – keyboards, arrangements
 Greg Phillinganes – keyboards
 Richard Tee – keyboards
 Steve Goldstein – synthesizers
 Jason Miles – synthesizers
 Steve Farris – guitars
 Eric Gale – guitars
 Jeff Mironov – guitars
 Francisco Centeno – bass
 Nathan East – bass
 Chuck Rainey – bass
 Steve Ferrone – drums, percussion
 Steve Gadd – drums, percussion
 Ivan Hampden – drums
 Tommy Vig – drums, percussion
 Paulinho da Costa – percussion
 Sammy Figueroa – percussion
 Marc Katz – arrangements
 Paul Riser – arrangements
 Charles Samek – arrangements
 Albert Schoonmaker – arrangements
 John "Skip" Anderson – arrangements (11)
 Jocelyn Brown – backing vocals
 Dennis Collins – backing vocals
 Benny Diggs – backing vocals
 Lani Groves – backing vocals
 Maeretha Stewart – backing vocals
 Darryl Tookes – backing vocals
 Luther Vandross – backing vocals (11)

Production

 Producers – Tom Dowd (Tracks 1-10 & 12); Luther Vandross (Track 11).
 Executive Producer – Diana Ross 
 Engineers – Larry Alexander (Tracks 1-10 & 12); Paul Brown and Bruce Wildstein (Track 11).
 Assistant Engineers (Tracks 1-10 & 12) – Nick Basich, Don Rodenback and Adrian Trujillo.
 Track 11 mixed by Ray Bardani at Minot Studios (White Plains, NY).
 Recorded at Record Plant and Power Station (New York, NY); Encore Studios (Burbank, CA); Westlake Studios (Los Angeles, CA).
 Mastered by Ted Jensen at Sterling Sound (New York, NY).
 Musical Contractor – Sephra Herman
 Art Direction – Ria Lewerke
 Design – Pietro Alfieri
 Photography – Herb Ritts
 Stylist – Michael Roberts

Charts

References

External links

1987 albums
Diana Ross albums
Albums produced by Tom Dowd
Albums produced by Luther Vandross
RCA Records albums